Zakletva (English: Oath) is the fifth studio album by Bosnian Serb singer Stoja and was recorded with Srki Boy, who also produced it. It was released in 2003.

Track listing
Zakletva (Oath)
Živeo (Long Live)
Da zavolim ludo... (To Fall Madly in Love...)
Moj život je moje blago (My Life is My Treasure)
O ne, ne, ne (Oh, No, No, No)
Samo idi (Just Leave)
Sava tiho teče (The Sava Quietly Flows)
Nije lako biti mlad (It's Not Easy Being Young)

References

2003 albums
Stoja albums
Grand Production albums